Pleasant View School is a historic one-room school located near Medford, Johnson County, Missouri. It was built in 1915, and is a one-story, side-gabled, bungaloid frame building. The blackboard, desks, book cases, a water cooler and an oil stove are intact from when the building was last used as a schoolhouse in 1957.  Also on the property are the contributing school privy, the foundation of a coal storage building, and a well with a hand pump.

It was listed on the National Register of Historic Places in 1999.

References

One-room schoolhouses in Missouri
School buildings on the National Register of Historic Places in Missouri
School buildings completed in 1915
Buildings and structures in Johnson County, Missouri
National Register of Historic Places in Johnson County, Missouri
1915 establishments in Missouri